Andreas Eberhard Freiherr von Budberg-Bönninghausen (tr. )  (10 August 1750 – 1 September 1812) was a Baltic German diplomat who served as Foreign Minister in 1806–07.

Biography 
By birth, member of an old Baltic German noble House of Budberg, he was the son of Jacob von Budberg-Bönninghausen (d. 1759) and his wife, Marie Elisabeth von Below (1725-1782). His ancestors moved to Livonia in the 16th century from Westphalia. Budberg was born in Riga and entered the military service in 1759. He participated in the Russo-Turkish war 1768–1774. In 1783 Budberg was promoted to podpolkovnik. The same year Riga governor-general  George Browne recommended Budberg to the Empress Catherine II as a diplomat. In fact, Budberg had been serving in the army as an infantry officer and had no diplomatic experience. Brown did it because he was a good friend of Budberg's parents.

In 1784 he was appointed a tutor to Catherine's grandson Alexander I and held this position until 1795. In 1793 Budberg was sent to Stockholm to arrange marriage of Catherine's granddaughter Alexandra Pavlovna and young king of Sweden Gustav IV Adolf. Initially consent was given, but later Gustav IV Adolf renounced the betrothal. Two years later Budberg was appointed ambassador in Sweden. In 1799 Catherine II died and Paul I succeeded her. Paul I disliked Budberg and soon he was forced to resign.

In 1804 Alexander I appointed him to the State Council. Budberg was known for his distrust of Napoleon and in 1806 he became Minister of Foreign Affairs. However, in 1807 when the treaties of Tilsit were signed, he resigned and retired from politics.

Personal life
He was married to Anna Helene Charlotte von Meck (1762-1799), daughter of Johann Gotthard von Meck (1731-1779) and his wife, Dorothea Elisabeth von Campenhausen (b. 1741). They had three daughters:
 Baroness Martha von Budberg-Bönninghausen (1783-1787)
 Baroness Katharina von Budberg-Bönninghausen (1785-1842)
 Baroness Helene Julie von Budberg-Bönninghausen (1787-1856); married her cousin, Baron Theodor Otto von Budberg-Bönninghausen (1779–1840). They were parents of:
 Baron Andrey Fedorovich von Budberg, Russian diplomat

References

External links
 Genealogisches Handbuch der baltischen Ritterschaften, Teil 1, 2: Livland, Lfg. 9-15, Görlitz 1929, pp.648

1750 births
1812 deaths
Diplomats from Riga
People from Kreis Riga
Baltic-German people
Foreign ministers of the Russian Empire
Diplomats of the Russian Empire
Politicians of the Russian Empire
Russian nobility
18th-century Latvian people
People of the Russo-Turkish War (1768–1774)